The Oakley Country Club is a private 18 hole golf club located in Watertown, Massachusetts. It was founded in 1898 and has served Bobby Jones (when he was going to Harvard) and Donald Ross (who served as the club professional when he arrived from Scotland).

External links
 Official site

1898 establishments in Massachusetts
Buildings and structures in Watertown, Massachusetts
Golf clubs and courses in Massachusetts
Golf clubs and courses designed by Donald Ross
Sports venues in Middlesex County, Massachusetts
Sports venues completed in 1898